{{Infobox boxing match
| fight date = March 1, 2003
| Fight Name = Never Take A Heavyweight Lightly
| location = Thomas & Mack Center, Paradise, Nevada, US
| image = 
| fighter1 = John Ruiz
| nickname1 = The Quietman
| record1 = 38–4–1 (27 KO)
| height1 = 6 ft 2 in
| weight1 = 226 lb
| style1 = Orthodox
| hometown1 = Chelsea, Massachusetts, US
| recognition1 = WBA heavyweight champion
| fighter2 = Roy Jones Jr.
| nickname2 = Junior
| record2 = 47–1 (38 KO)
| hometown2 = Pensacola, Florida, US
| height2 = 5 ft 11 in
| weight2 = 193 lb
| style2 = Orthodox
| recognition2 = WBA (Super), WBC, IBF and The Ring light heavyweight champion[[The Ring (magazine)|The Ring]] No. 1 ranked pound-for-pound fighter3-division world champion
| titles = WBA heavyweight title
| result = Jones Jr. wins via 12–round unanimous decision (116–112, 117–111, 118–110)
}}

John Ruiz vs. Roy Jones Jr., billed as Never Take A Heavyweight Lightly'', was a professional boxing match contested on March 1, 2003 for the WBA heavyweight championship. The fight took place at the Thomas & Mack Center on the campus of UNLV in Paradise, Nevada.

Ruiz was making the third defense of the title he won in 2001 from Evander Holyfield, while Jones was trying to become only the second reigning world light heavyweight champion to win a heavyweight championship after Michael Spinks; he was also looking to join Spinks and Bob Fitzsimmons as the only fighters to win titles at heavyweight and light heavyweight and would match Fitzsimmons as the only other fighter to win titles at heavyweight and middleweight.

Background
Late in 2002 Jones, who had already been a world champion at middleweight and super middleweight in addition to his light heavyweight title reign, announce he was going to move up to the heavyweight division to challenge Ruiz for the WBA championship. Jones had become a star in the light heavyweight division and at the time of his match with Ruiz, held titles from seven different boxing organizations. Ruiz's promoter Don King had spent much of 2002 negotiating with Jones in an effort to get him to agree to move up to heavyweight and challenge Ruiz. 

Ruiz, meanwhile, had fought twice since winning the WBA championship from Holyfield. The first was a third fight with the former undisputed world champion, which ended in a split draw. In the second fight, which took place on July 27, 2002 in Las Vegas, was against unbeaten Canadian contender Kirk Johnson. Ruiz was fouled multiple times during the course of the ten round contest and won after referee Joe Cortez disqualified Johnson. 

Jones accepted an offer that guaranteed him $10 million. Ruiz, however, received no guaranteed money and instead agreed to take a share of the pay-per-view profits. This led to some bad blood between the two sides as Ruiz accused Jones of under-promoting the fight.

The fight
Despite giving up a lot of height and weight to Ruiz, Jones dominated most of the fight. Jones used his superior boxing skills and hand speed to his advantage and used timely jabs and uppercuts against Ruiz, who was unable to land a sustained amount of offense, only connecting with 89 of 433 thrown punches for a dismal 21% success rate. By round four Jones' punches caused Ruiz's nose to bleed, which hindered Ruiz for the remainder of the fight. The fight went the full 12 rounds with neither man being able to score a knockdown. The official judges' scorecards were one-sided in Jones' favor and he secured a unanimous decision victory with scores of 118–110, 117–111 and 116–112. Unofficial HBO judge Harold Lederman scored the fight 119–109 for Jones, while the Associated Press scored the fight 116–112 for Jones.

Aftermath
After the fight, it was not known if Jones was going to continue to fight in the heavyweight division or return to the light heavyweight division. As a result, the WBA named Jones the "champion in recess" and gave him until February 20, 2004 to defend the title. The WBC and IBF, meanwhile, stripped Jones of their light heavyweight championships. 

Jones indeed returned to light heavyweight on November 8, 2003 to challenge Antonio Tarver, who had won the WBC and IBF light heavyweight titles that Jones had vacated (Tarver would vacate the IBF title prior to his fight with Jones, however). Jones appeared weak and sluggish after dropping 24 pounds since the night of his fight against Ruiz, but Jones nevertheless picked up the majority decision victory over Tarver to regain the WBC light heavyweight title, becoming the first reigning heavyweight champion to move down and win a light heavyweight title. Though there were rumours of potential heavyweight matchups with Lennox Lewis, Evander Holyfield and especially with Mike Tyson, Jones decided to remain in the light heavyweight division after the Tyson fight fell through, and officially vacated the WBA heavyweight title on February 20, 2004.

Prior to Jones' vacating the title, Ruiz met former WBC and IBF heavyweight champion Hasim Rahman for the "interim" WBA heavyweight championship on December 13, 2003. Ruiz would earn the victory by unanimous decision and following Jones relinquishing his title in February, became recognized as the official WBA heavyweight champion. He would defend the title twice more successfully against Fres Oquendo and Andrew Golota. In 2005, Ruiz initially lost the WBA title to another former middleweight champion in James Toney, but after Toney failed a post fight drug test the result was changed to a no contest and Ruiz remained champion. He would lose the title in his next fight to Nikolai Valuev.

References

World Boxing Association heavyweight championship matches
2003 in boxing
Boxing in Las Vegas
2003 in sports in Nevada
March 2003 sports events in the United States